Gilles C. Bisson  (born May 14, 1957) is a Franco-Ontarian politician in Ontario, Canada. He was a New Democratic member of the Legislative Assembly of Ontario from 1990 until his defeat in the 2022 Ontario general election. From 1999 to 2022 he represented the northern riding of Timmins. He most recently served as the party's House Leader and is a critic for Natural Resources and Forestry issues.

Bisson lost his seat to Progressive Conservative candidate George Pirie in the 2022 Ontario general election.

Background
Bisson is Franco-Ontarian. He was a labour union organizer, who worked for the Ontario Federation of Labour (of which he was the Northeast Director for a time).

A licensed private pilot, Bisson owns a small aircraft which he uses to fly between communities in his far-flung riding, the legislative seat in Toronto and elsewhere. Bisson was a member of the Royal Canadian Air Cadets with #10 Timmins Kiwanis Squadron where he attained the rank of Flight Sergeant. He also served in both the Canadian Armed Forces "reg force" in 1974/1975 and as a reservist with the Algonquin Regiment B Company.

Bisson is married, is a father of two daughters, and is a grandfather of four.

Politics
Bisson was elected to the Ontario legislature in the provincial election of 1990, defeating Liberal Frank Krznaric by about 2,000 votes in the old riding of Cochrane South. He served as parliamentary assistant to the Ministers of Northern Development and Mines and Francophone Affairs in Bob Rae's government, and also served as a member of the cabinet committee on the North American Free Trade Agreement in 1993.

Although the NDP were defeated in the provincial election of 1995, Bisson significantly increased the margin of his victory in Cochrane South. He was, in fact, the only NDP candidate elected with more than 50% riding support in that cycle. He was easily re-elected in the 1999 election, and fought off a closer challenge from Liberal Michael Doody, a former mayor of Timmins and broadcaster, in the election of 2003. He was re-elected in  2007, 2011, and 2014.

Bisson's popularity has helped make Timmins—James Bay one of the top ridings in Ontario for the federal NDP as well, helping Charlie Angus pick up the seat in the 2004 election.

On August 29, 2008, Bisson announced he would run to succeed Howard Hampton in the 2009 Ontario New Democratic Party leadership election. Bisson was defeated, finishing in third place behind first runner-up Peter Tabuns and the victor, Andrea Horwath.

From 2014 until 2022 he was the party's House Leader and was the NDP's critic for Natural Resources and Forestry issues.

Electoral record

References

External links
 
 

1957 births
Canadian aviators
Franco-Ontarian people
Living people
Ontario New Democratic Party MPPs
People from Timmins
21st-century Canadian politicians